Pseudopostega latiplana is a moth of the family Opostegidae. It was described by Andrius Remeikis and Jonas R. Stonis in 2009. It is known from the Pacific Coast of Mexico.

The length of the forewings is 1.8–2 mm. Adults have been recorded in November.

Etymology
The species name is derived from the Latin lata (meaning broad, wide) and plana (meaning flattened) in reference to the prominent, lateral lobes of the uncus and gnathos.

References

Opostegidae
Moths described in 2009